Lakshmi Narasimha  is a 2004 Indian Telugu-language action film produced by Bellamkonda Suresh on Sri Sai Ganesh Productions banner and directed by Jayanth C. Paranjee. Starring Nandamuri Balakrishna, Asin and Prakash Raj, with music composed by Mani Sharma. The film was released on January 14, 2004, to positive reviews and declared as hit. The film is remake of 2003, Tamil Movie Saamy. The film was later dubbed into Malayalam as Lakshmi Narasimhan and Hindi as IPS Narasimha in 2010 by Aditya Music.

Plot
The film begins at Vijayawada which is in jeopardy of demonic leader Dharmabhiksham with crime & corruption. DCP Lakshmi Narasimha Swamy a stout-hearted cop lands at the city and makes rules of his own. He commands the sub-ordinates to do whatever they wish, provided the public is not harmed, ruthlessly forsakes anyone, and arrests the thugs. In his administration law & order are shaped and people are safe & sound. Following this, Dharmabhiksham invites and warns him about his transfer because he forbears the bribe. Surprisingly, Swamy agrees to do so, by the terms & conditions which Dharmabhiksham accepts. 

Once, Swamy is acquainted with a pure college-going girl Rukmini in search of a home. Rukmini misconstrues him as a thief but ensues the reality and regrets. After a series of frequent rendezvous turn to love. In the interim, the citizens are assaulted at Dharmabhiksham’s gas station for questioning that they are pouring less petrol. So, Swamy raids and seals it when Dharmabhiksham mortifies him as his suborner. Listening to it, Rukmini loathes him as she averses corruption. Next, Swamy meets Rukmini and divulges his past. 

After completion of his IPS, Swamy takes charge and apprehends honorable-seeking criminals led by Dharmabhiksham. Hence, he onslaughts which cost Swamy’s sister and many natives of his village. Plus, Swamy is dismissed with false allegations but his father regains his post with the hush money and asks him on duty to rehabilitate ruined villagers. That's why he is taking bribes of which Dharmabhiksham is unbeknownst. Then, Rukmini comprehends his virtue and their nuptial is fixed. 

Meanwhile, on the eve of the festival, the ruling party calls for a strike when the retail vendors plead with Swamy to provide security. Whereat, he holds the responsibility and hinders the shuts in of Dharmabhisham which calls off the protest. Subsequently, enraged Dharmabhiksham waiting for a shot, cabals while wedlock of Swamy and detonates the market. Being cognizant of the brutality Swamy counterattacks, and as a result, he is transferred with 1-week duty remaining in the city. Here, Swamy challenges Dharmabhiksham it’s sufficient to collapse his dynasty. Moreover, he triumphs in it with his several enforcement tactics. 

As of today, Dharmabhiksham ruses by planting a bomb at Swamy’s residence. Knowledging it, Swamy sends Rukmini to his hometown but unfortunately, his father swaps and dies in the blast. Now incensed Swamy accumulates all the pieces of evidence against Dharmabhiksham and takes an arrest warrant against him. Despite the hindering of the authorities & ministers he moves to seize him. After a huge hunt, Swamy catches hold of Dharmabhiksham when prepares to surrender and scoffs at him.  At last, Swamy encounters him and secretly burns his corpse leaving him as a missing case for absconding riots, revenge, & public harm. Finally, the movie ends with Lakshmi Narasimha Swamy proceeding further constraint to his duty.

Cast

Soundtrack

The music was composed by Mani Sharma, and was released on 25 December 2003 by Supreme Music Company.

Reception
Local review site Idlebrain rated the film three and a half stars and noted, "Bala Krishna's terrific performance is the biggest strength of the film. The first half of the film is entertaining. The second half is OK. And when Shiva Rama Krishna directs the heroine, the focus must be on the navel, this movie Heroine Asin opening starts with a focus on Navel. The famous video song director seems to be normal in the outing, yet he never loses focus on the glamour of the girl and heroism of the hero at any given point." Sify movies stated "Lakshmi Narasimha, the police story is being appreciated for its story, presentation and heroism of Balakrishna, the hero. It has taken a fantastic opening all over and is expected to be a long distance winner".

Controversy
Balakrishna was involved in a shooting controversy. The incident took place on 3 June 2004 around 20:50 hrs at his residence in Jubilee Hills, Hyderabad. The actor has fired shots at the producer B.Suresh and his associate, Satyanarayana Chowdhary. Later both the wounded were admitted into Apollo hospital. The circumstances under which the case was handled led to much controversy as purported by the Human Right Forum (HRF). The HRF has questioned the authenticity of the people who handled the case, and the circumstances under which the actor was shielded from police by giving refuge in the CARE Hospital without any justifiable cause.

The two victims have given statements before the magistrate alleging that the actor has fired shots at them during their treatment in the hospital, but soon they were retracted and made volte-face of their earlier statements. The actor was arrested later on 6 June at around 3:30 AM and produced before fifth Metropolitan Magistrate. A show cause notice was also served on Bala Krishna's wife Vasundhara Devi as the weapon used was licensed under her name, and she could not give sufficient protection to her licensed weapon. But later, the actor was granted bail.

References

External links
 

2004 films
Telugu remakes of Tamil films
Films scored by Mani Sharma
2000s Telugu-language films
Indian action drama films
Films shot in Vijayawada
Films set in Vijayawada
2004 action drama films
Indian police films
Fictional portrayals of the Andhra Pradesh Police
Fictional Indian police officers